Andrej Martin was the defending champion, but lost in the semifinals to Andreas Haider-Maurer. 
Damir Džumhur won the title, beating Haider-Maurer in the final, 6–3, 6–3.

Seeds

  Andreas Haider-Maurer (final)
  Máximo González (quarterfinals)
  Filippo Volandri (first round)
  Damir Džumhur (champion)
  Norbert Gombos (semifinals)
  Simone Bolelli (first round, withdrew before the match)
  Aljaž Bedene (withdrew)
  Andrej Martin (semifinals)

Draw

Finals

Top half

Bottom half

References
 Main Draw
 Qualifying Draw

San Benedetto Tennis Cup - Singles
2014 Singles